Anders Nordstad (born 14 August 1964) is a Norwegian retired footballer who played as a midfielder.

He played junior football for Asker and senior football for Frigg and Bærum. Moving to Mannheim to study business administration, he featured for third-tier club VfR Mannheim. He joined Stabæk in the summer of 1992, securing promotions from 1993 2. divisjon and 1994 1. divisjon. In the 1995 Tippeligaen, he played seven league games before retiring.

References

1964 births
Living people
Norwegian footballers
People from Asker
Frigg Oslo FK players
VfR Mannheim players
Bærum SK players
Stabæk Fotball players
Eliteserien players
Norwegian First Division players
Association football midfielders
Norwegian expatriate footballers
Expatriate footballers in Germany
Norwegian expatriate sportspeople in Germany
Sportspeople from Viken (county)